Charles Dole may refer to:

Charles Minot Dole (1899–1976), founder of the National Ski Patrol
Charles Fletcher Dole (1845–1927), Unitarian minister
Charles Sidney Dole (1819–?), midwestern (USA) agribusiness entrepreneur, who helped establish standards used by the Chicago Board of Trade

References